Cemal Akçin (1889 – 18 December 1940) was a Turkish industrialist and politician.

References 

1889 births
1940 deaths
People from Afyonkarahisar
Place of death missing
Republican People's Party (Turkey) politicians